German submarine U-1229 was a Type IXC/40 U-boat built for Nazi Germany's Kriegsmarine during World War II.

Design
German Type IXC/40 submarines were slightly larger than the original Type IXCs. U-1229 had a displacement of  when at the surface and  while submerged. She had two shafts and two  propellers.

U-1229 was fitted with six  torpedo tubes (four fitted at the bow and two at the stern), 22 torpedoes, one  SK C/32 naval gun, 180 rounds, and a  Flak M42 as well as two twin  C/30 anti-aircraft guns. The boat had a complement of forty-eight.

Service history
U-1229 was ordered on 14 October 1941 from Deutsche Werft AG Weser in Hamburg-Finkenwerder under the yard number 392. Her keel was laid down on 2 March 1943 and was launched on 22 October 1943. About three months later she was commissioned into service under the command of Kapitänleutnant Arnim Zinke (Crew 31) in the 31st U-boat Flotilla on 13 January 1944.

After completing training and work-up for deployment, U-1229 was transferred to the 10th U-boat Flotilla for front-line service on 1 August 1944. The U-boat left Kiel on 13 July 1944 for the first and only war patrol operating unsuccessfully against Allied shipping in the North Atlantic and off the coast of Canada. Having been heavily damaged in the initial air attack, U-1229 attempted to escape under water but was forced to surface again as poisonous fumes started to develop from the damaged battery sections. While the crew was abandoning ship, the U-boat was strafed by several aircraft resulting in the death of numerous crew members, including Zinke. In total 18 crew members died while 41 survivors were picked up by a US destroyer after seven hours in the water. One of the survivors was the experienced German intelligence agent Oskar Mantel.

References

Bibliography

World War II submarines of Germany
German Type IX submarines
1943 ships
Ships built in Hamburg
U-boats commissioned in 1944
U-boats sunk in 1944
U-boats sunk by US aircraft
Maritime incidents in August 1944